Something Wrong may refer to:

 Something Wrong (album), an album by Bang Gang
 "Something Wrong", a song from Camouflage's album Relocated
 "Something Wrong", a song from Dash and Will's album Up in Something
 "Something Wrong", a song from Angel Witch's album Frontal Assault
 "Something Wrong", a song by Wonderboom (band)
 "Something Wrong", a song by Papa Vegas
 "Something Wrong", a song by Chicane's album Easy To Assemble (commercially unreleased)

Other uses 
 Something Wrong, a novel by E. Nesbit
 Something Wrong, a novel by James Stern

See also 
 Something's Wrong (disambiguation)